The NOPO officially standing for Counter-terrorism Special Force, and in some sources Guardians of the Islamic Jurist Special Forces is an Iranian special force acting under Amīr al-Mu'minīn Unit of Special Units Command of Law Enforcement Command of Islamic Republic of Iran.

NOPO's duty is usually mentioned hostage rescue, but it is argued that the unit is a riot police, as it was involved in Iran student protests, July 1999 according to a report by Supreme National Security Council.

The unit has been compared to the Army's NOHED and IRGC's Saberin Unit by its commanders. However, there is little known about the unit. The NOPO is also often confused with the "Special Unit", which is actually its parent organization, and there are many rumors surrounding the unit itself.

The NOPO acronym had been claimed to be an acronym for "Wilayat Guardian Special Force" by reformist media in late 1990s; the association was denied. Members of the unit are known to be wearing balaclava and black suits, though they may use another uniform.

History 
The operational history of the Anti-Terror Special Forces includes deployments against internal security threats.

Weapons
Members of the unit are known to use the Tondar SMG 9mm which is the Iranian made Heckler & Koch MP5. Members have also been seen with the Dragunov SVD 7.62×54mmR which is the sniper utilized by the unit which has also been spotted in the hands of members when marching in parade. The locally made copy of the Heckler & Koch G3 7.62×51mm is also used, sometimes in the case of a marksman rifle. The sidearm utilized is the Zoaf PC-9 which is the Iranian copy of the SIG Sauer P226. Other weapons used include the AKM 7.62×39mm assault rifle and the Remington 870 shotgun which was acquired before the Iranian Revolution and is believed to be produced locally under another name.
Iranian-made Masaf rifle is also used since 2022.

References 

Special forces of Iran
Law Enforcement Command of Islamic Republic of Iran
Counterterrorism in Iran